Miljenko Vučić (born 6 October 1981) is a Croatian Paralympic athlete who competes in international track and field competitions, he is a shot putter and former discus thrower. He is a World silver medalist and European champion in shot put. He has competed at the 2016 and 2020 Summer Paralympics, Vučić narrowly missed a medal in shot put event at the 2020 Summer Paralympics.

References

1981 births
Living people
People from Ogulin
Paralympic athletes of Croatia
Croatian male discus throwers
Croatian male shot putters
Athletes (track and field) at the 2016 Summer Paralympics
Athletes (track and field) at the 2020 Summer Paralympics
Medalists at the World Para Athletics Championships
Medalists at the World Para Athletics European Championships
Visually impaired shot putters
Paralympic shot putters
21st-century Croatian people